The 1928 Tour de France was the 22nd edition of the Tour de France, one of cycling's Grand Tours. The Tour began in Paris with a team time trial on 17 June, and Stage 12 occurred on 2 July with a mountainous stage from Marseille. The race finished in Paris on 15 July.

Stage 12
2 July 1928 - Marseille to Nice,

Stage 13
4 July 1928 - Nice to Grenoble,

Stage 14
6 July 1928 - Grenoble to Evian,

Stage 15
8 July 1928 - Evian to Pontarlier,  (TTT)

Stage 16
9 July 1928 - Pontarlier to Belfort,  (TTT)

Stage 17
10 July 1928 - Belfort to Strasbourg,  (TTT)

Stage 18
11 July 1928 - Strasbourg to Metz,  (TTT)

Stage 19
12 July 1928 - Metz to Charleville,  (TTT)

Stage 20
13 July 1928 - Charleville to Malo-les-Bains,  (TTT)

Stage 21
14 July 1928 - Malo-les-Bains to Dieppe,  (TTT)

Stage 22
15 July 1928 - Dieppe to Paris,

References

1928 Tour de France
Tour de France stages